Pinangtinggi is a village in the Jambi Province of Sumatra, Indonesia.

Nearby towns and villages include Pulaugading (16.1 nm), Berangan (5.0 nm), Betung (5.8 nm), Bejubang (9.0 nm), Talangpelempang (13.6 nm), Talang Gudang (12.2 nm), Melabuai (11.2 nm) and Hulukandang (9.2 nm).

References

External links
Satellite map at Maplandia.com

Populated places in Jambi